Dachra is a 2018 Tunisian horror film, written and directed by Abdelhamid Bouchnak as his first feature film.

Plot
Three journalism students, Yasmine, Walid and Bilel, set off to investigate a cold case for a school film project. After visiting a mental hospital to interview Mongia, the mutilated survivor of an attack 20 years before, the trail leads them out to an isolated village. Before they fully understand what is happening, they find themselves beset by cannibal witches.

Cast
Yasmine Dimassi as Yasmine
Aziz Jbali as Walid
Bilel Slatnia as Bilel
Hela Ayed as Mongia

Reception
Dachra was the closing film for International Critics' Week at the 75th Venice International Film Festival.

References

External links

2018 horror films
Tunisian drama films